Salahlı Kəngərli is a village in the Aghdam District of Azerbaijan.

References 

Populated places in Aghdam District